The New South Wales Department of Regional NSW is a department of the New South Wales Government. A central focus for the department is enhancing the liveability of regional and rural communities by strengthening local workforces and attracting key workers, boosting housing, and empowering the diversification of local economies.

The department is a central agency and advises across government on issues affecting the state’s regions, which are home to about one-third of the NSW population. 

Key responsibilities of the department also include building stronger primary industries, driving local investment and economic development, brokering solutions to strengthen social cohesion, overseeing productive and sustainable land use and natural resources, and delivering local infrastructure and grant programs.

The department was established on 2 April 2020 to coordinate support for communities, businesses and farmers hit by the Black Summer bushfires and drought. The department went onto support additional crises including floods and COVID-19, becoming a key voice advocating for local communities within government. It assumed the functions of the Regions, Industry, Agriculture and Resources division from the Department of Planning, Industry and Environment. It also brought together Department of Primary Industries, Local Land Services, Resources and Geoscience and regional coordination across the government.

Structure
The Department is the lead agency in the Regional NSW cluster, led by the Secretary Rebecca Fox, who reports to the following ministers:
 Deputy Premier and Minister for Regional New South Wales, presently Paul Toole 
 Minister for Agriculture and Minister for Western New South Wales, presently Dugald Saunders 
 Minister for Regional Youth, presently Ben Franklin 

Ultimately the ministers are responsible to the Parliament of New South Wales.

Agencies
The following agencies are included in the Regional NSW cluster, administered by the Department:
 Department of Primary Industries
 Forestry Corporation of NSW (state-owned corporation)
 Local Land Services
 Mining, Exploration and Geoscience (MEG)
 Northern Rivers Reconstruction Corporation
 NSW Resources Regulator
 Office of the Cross-Border Commissioner
 Public Works
 Soil Conservation Service

Office locations
Nearly 80 per cent of the department’s staff live in the regional communities they serve. In June 2020, it was announced that the department will have four offices, located at Queanbeyan, Armidale, Dubbo and Coffs Harbour. Staff are also based in other regional centres, including Wagga Wagga and Nowra.

See also

List of New South Wales government agencies

References

External links
Regional NSW
Regional NSW - NSW Government
Regional NSW - NSW Government Directory

Regional NSW
2020 establishments in Australia